The coconut tree is a member of the palm tree family.

Coconut Tree is the title of the following songs:

 "Coconut Tree" (1969), by The Humblebums
 "Coconut Tree" (1974), by Gerry Rafferty from his album Gerry Rafferty
 "Coconut Tree" (1989), by Brendan Croker And The 5 O'Clock Shadows, traditional tune arranged by Croker
 "Coconut Tree" (song) (2011), from Mohombi's debut album MoveMeant
 "Coconut Tree" (2013) (with Willie Nelson), from Kenny Chesney's album Life on a Rock
 "Coconut Tree" (2017), from Shakira's album El Dorado